Puerto Rico Highway 66 (PR-66) is a main tollway which parallels Puerto Rico Highway 3 going from the city of Carolina, Puerto Rico via a 3 loops cloverleaf interchange with PR-26 and PR-3, a major exit in the form of a Trumpet interchange in Canóvanas, Puerto Rico  and ending in the municipality of Río Grande, Puerto Rico with an intersection of PR-3.

The highway is called the Roberto Sánchez Vilella Expressway, which is also the name given to the much larger PR-2  freeway segment from Hormigueros to Ponce. The second phase of PR-66 from Canóvanas to Río Grande was opened on 1 October 2012.

Route description

Naming
PR-66 is, in reality, an extension of older expressway PR-26, as both expressways are attached (that is, there is no need to take an exit to enter the other expressway, much like PR-18 and PR-52). PR-66 was assigned that number after U.S. Route 66 in the United States.

Controversy
PR-66 is very close to the El Yunque National Forest and at the start of construction there were problems between developers and environmental activists. Several acts of disobedience took place, including removing beams which had already been installed. The expressway was planned to be extended to Fajardo but due to the close presence of the forest reserve, it was accorded to be extended to Río Grande and connect to PR-3 which has several exits between that municipality and Fajardo. It it is possible PR-3 will be converted into a complete freeway, in that segment, as it approaches PR-53.

The short expressway is very expensive in terms of toll fees and many people still go through PR-3 as a consequence. There are no plans to change the cost. The current toll fees are $1.50 and $1.00, respectively. The result is that PR-66 has low traffic most all the time, including during rush hours. As of December 2011, the toll must be paid by pre-paid AutoExpreso.

Tolls

Exit list

See also

 Interstate Highways in Puerto Rico
 List of highways numbered 66

Notes

References

External links

 

066
66
66
Tolled sections of Interstate Highways